The 1983 German Grand Prix was a Formula One motor race held at the Hockenheimring on 7 August 1983. It was the tenth race of the 1983 Formula One World Championship.

The 45-lap race was won by French driver René Arnoux, driving a Ferrari, after he started from second position. Teammate and compatriot Patrick Tambay took pole position, but retired on lap 12 with an engine failure. Italian Andrea de Cesaris finished second in an Alfa Romeo, with another Italian, Riccardo Patrese, third in a Brabham-BMW.

Drivers' Championship leader, Frenchman Alain Prost, could only manage fourth in his Renault, but nonetheless extended his lead in the championship to nine points over Brazilian Nelson Piquet, who failed to score in the other Brabham-BMW. With his second win in three races, Arnoux moved up to fourth in the championship, five points behind Piquet and three behind Tambay in third.

Niki Lauda was disqualified from fifth for reversing his McLaren-Ford in the pits.

Classification

Qualifying

Race

Championship standings after the race

Drivers' Championship standings

Constructors' Championship standings

References

German Grand Prix
German Grand Prix
German Grand Prix
German Grand Prix